Ravenswood may refer to:

Film and literature
 Ravenswood, the name of a Swedish forest in Beowulf, the setting of a battle between Geats and Swedes
 Ravenswood (film), a 2006 Australian thriller, starring Stephen Moyer, Travis Fimmel and Teresa Palmer
Ravenswood (TV series), a spin-off of Pretty Little Liars
 Ravenswood: The Steelworkers' Victory and the Revival of American Labor, a book by Kate Bronfenbrenner and Tom Juravich
Ravenswood Castle, a fictional setting in the Scottish Lowlands, featured in Sir Walter Scott's 1819 classic, The Bride of Lammermoor

Places

Australia
Ravenswood, Queensland, a town
Ravenswood Mining Landscape and Chinese Settlement Area, a heritage-listed area within the town
Ravenswood, Tasmania, suburb of Launceston, Tasmania
Ravenswood, Victoria, a locality near Bendigo
Ravenswood, Western Australia, a town

United Kingdom
Ravenswood, Cumbernauld, the largest town in North Lanarkshire, Scotland
Ravenswood, Ipswich, a district within the city of Ipswich, Essex, England
Ravenswood, Berkshire (alias Bigshot), an estate in Wokingham Without, Berkshire, England

United States
(by state)
Ravenswood (Livermore, California), listed on the NRHP in California
The Ravenswood, Hollywood, California, a 1930s landmark apartment building, longtime home of Mae West
Ravenswood Winery in Sonoma County, California
The former Ravenswood High School (East Palo Alto), operated 1958-1976
Ravenswood, Chicago
Ravenswood (Indianapolis), Indiana, a neighborhood along the White River
Ravenswood Place, 19th century plantation in Concordia Parish, Louisiana; belonged to the parents of the Duchess of Manchester
Ravenswood, Louisiana, an unincorporated community in Pointe Coupee Parish, Louisiana
Ravenswood (Bunceton, Missouri), listed on the NRHP in Missouri
Ravenswood, Queens, in Queens, New York
Ravenswood (Brentwood, Tennessee), listed on the NRHP in Tennessee
Ravenswood, West Virginia

Schools
 Ravenswood School (disambiguation), several schools

Other uses
Ravenswood Australian Women's Art Prize, a group of art prizes
Ravenswood Generating Station, including "Big Allis", in Queens, New York
Ravenswood Line, former name of the Brown Line of the Chicago "L" system
Ravenswood station, a Chicago Metra railroad station
Ravenswood Road, Dunedin, a road in St Clair, a suburb of Dunedin

See also
 Ravenwood (disambiguation)
 Ravenswood Historic District (disambiguation)